Inzamam-ul-Haq is a retired Pakistani cricketer, and a former captain of the Pakistan national cricket team. He scored centuries (100 or more runs in an innings) in Test matches and One Day International (ODI) matches on 25 and 10 occasions respectively during his international career. Inzamam played 120 Test matches for Pakistan and scored 8,820 runs. He is the third-highest run scorer for Pakistan in Test cricket, after Younis Khan and Javed Miandad. He was described by the BBC as "one of the most recognisable figures in cricket" and "one of the finest batsmen around", while former Pakistan captain Imran Khan said that he was "as talented as Brian Lara and Sachin Tendulkar".

Inzamam made his Test debut against England at Edgbaston, Birmingham, in June 1992. His first Test century came a year later against the West Indies at Antigua Recreation Ground, St John's, Antigua. His score of 329, against New Zealand at the Gaddafi Stadium, Lahore, in May 2002, is the second-highest total by a Pakistan batsman in Test cricket and the fifteenth-highest overall. He also scored a century in his 100th Test match, becoming only the fifth player to do so. Inzamam made a century in each innings of the second Test match of England's tour of Pakistan in 2005–06, to become Pakistan's leading century-maker with 24 centuries, breaking Miandad's record. His 119 against India during the second Test of the home series in January 2006 made him the tenth player to score 25 or more centuries in Test cricket. Inzamam scored Test centuries at 18 cricket grounds, including 13 at venues outside Pakistan. , he is joint twentieth (with Virat Kohli) among players with most hundreds in Test cricket.

Having made his ODI debut in November 1991 against the West Indies at the Gaddafi Stadium, Inzamam achieved his first ODI century a year later against Sri Lanka at the Multan Cricket Stadium. In ODI matches, Inzamam is fifth in the all-time list of highest-run scorers, with 11,739 runs from 378 matches, though he has the fewest centuries of the top ten players on that list. His highest ODI score of 137 not out came against New Zealand at the Sharjah Cricket Association Stadium, in 1994. Inzamam played his only Twenty 20 International match against England at the County Cricket Ground, Bristol, during the 2006 series between the two teams. He never scored a century in the format. , he ranks joint twenty-fifth among players with most hundreds in international cricket.

Key

Test cricket centuries

ODI centuries

References

Notes

Specific

External links

Inzamam
Inzamam-Ul-Haq